Warthen is a surname. Notable people with the surname include:

Dan Warthen (born 1952), American former baseball player and current coach
David Warthen (born 1957), American technology company founder
Ferol Sibley Warthen (1890–1986), American painter and printmaker

See also
Warthen, Georgia